The 1975–76 Austrian Hockey League season was the 46th season of the Austrian Hockey League, the top level of ice hockey in Austria. Eight teams participated in the league, and EC KAC won the championship.

Regular season

Relegation
Wiener EV - EC VSV (6:2, ?)

External links
Austrian Ice Hockey Association

Austria
Austrian Hockey League seasons
1975–76 in Austrian ice hockey